Double Good Everything is an album by the American R&B musician Smokey Robinson, released in 1991. It was his first album to be released by a label other than Motown.

The album peaked at No. 64 on the Billboard Top R&B Albums chart. Its first single was "Double Good Everything", which failed to make the R&B Top 20.

Production
Nine of Double Good Everything'''s 10 tracks were written or cowritten by Robinson, who also produced the album. "When a Woman Cries" was written by Joshua Kadison. Robinson worked with his longtime friend, guitar player Marv Tarplin.

Critical receptionEntertainment Weekly called the album "no watershed, just sweet, warm Smokey doing his bit for romantic drive-time inspiration, more courtly than salacious, and slightly teenage in his depictions of love." Stereo Review concluded that "the unifying thread is Robinson's singular voice—almost delicate but unmistakably masculine in its high register, marked by an eternal edge of youthful anticipation." The Kitchener-Waterloo Record opined that "except for 'Skid Row' and 'When a Woman Cries', Robinson sounds almost uninterested." The Buffalo News wrote that "though the peaks of his voice may be gone, the gentle emotive stirring is still there." The Indianapolis Star thought that Robinson's "excellent vocals are underscored by superb instrumentals, particularly on the intimate 'I Love Your Face' and the sashaying 'Rewind' and 'Be Who You Are'." The New Pittsburgh Courier deemed the album "10 new pop/soul gems that are remarkable for retaining the 'Smokey' touch while feeling perfectly contemporary." The Philadelphia Daily News labeled it Robinson's "strongest in years." The Commercial Appeal'' considered that "Robinson's falsetto is as sweet as ever, as he mixes in a bit of reggae in 'Why', joyously assays the uptempo pop-soul of the title track or croons 'Be Who You Are', a love song that hearkens back to his classic Motown days."

AllMusic wrote: "Though pleasant and inoffensive, this will disappoint even diehard Smokey Robinson fans and won't win him many new ones."

Track listing

Personnel
Smokey Robinson - vocals, basic arrangements
Marvin Tarplin - electric guitar
Bob "Boogie" Bowles - acoustic and electric guitar
Larry Ball - computer, sequencing, bass guitar, synthesizer
Reginald "Sonny" Burke - piano, percussion; string conductor on "I Love Your Face" and "When a Woman Cries"
Christopher Ho - keyboards
Tony Lewis - drums, percussion
David Li - saxophone, electronic wind instruments
Ivory Stone, Patricia Henley, Robert Henley, Ronald Henley - backing vocals
with:
Torrell Ruffin - guitar on "Rewind"
Robert Palmer - guitar solo on "Be Who You Are"
Chris Mostert - baritone saxophone on "I Can't Get Enough"; tenor saxophone on "You Take Me Away"
Michael Fell - harmonica on "Rack Me Back"
Barbra Porter, Davida Johnson, Donald Palmer, Ed Green, Gina Kronstadt, Marcella Schants, Maria Newman, Mark Cargill, Nicole Bush, Pam Gates - violin on "I Love Your Face" and "When a Woman Cries"
Robin Ross, Rollice Dale - viola on "I Love Your Face" and "When a Woman Cries"
David Low, Nancy K. Masaki-Hathaway, Suzie Katayama - cello on "I Love Your Face" and "When a Woman Cries"
Elizabeth Erman - harp on "I Love Your Face" 
Ron Clark - concertmaster on "I Love Your Face" and "When a Woman Cries"
Technical
Allan Kaufman, Dan Bates - associate producer, recording, mixing

References

Smokey Robinson albums 
1991 albums
SBK Records albums